The 2017 Women's Under 21 Australian Championships was a Field Hockey tournament held in the New South Wales city of Wollongong between 7–14 July 2017.

New South Wales won the tournament by defeating Western Australia 2–1 in the final. Queensland won the bronze medal by defeating South Australia 3–0 in the third and fourth playoff.

Competition format

The tournament is divided into two pools, Pool A and Pool B, consisting of four teams in a round-robin format. Teams then progress into either Pool C, the medal round, or Pool D, the classification round. Teams carry over points from their previous match ups, and contest teams they are yet to play.

The top two teams in each of pools A and B then progress to Pool C. The top two teams in Pool C continue to contest the Final, while the bottom two teams of Pool C play in the Third and Fourth-place match.

The remaining bottom placing teams make up Pool D. The top two teams in Pool D play in the Fifth and Sixth-place match, while the bottom two teams of Pool C play in the Seventh and Eighth-place match.

Teams

  Australian Capital Territory
  New South Wales
  Northern Territory
  Queensland
  South Australia
  Tasmania
  Victoria
  Western Australia

Results

First round

Pool A

Pool B

Second round

Pool C (Medal Round)

Pool D (Classification Round)

Classification matches

Seventh and eighth place

Fifth and sixth place

Third and fourth place

Final

Statistics

Final standings

External links

References

2017
2017 in Australian women's field hockey
Sports competitions in New South Wales
Sport in Wollongong